Tarkan Mustafa (born 28 August 1973) is an English former footballer who is a coach at Benfleet. A right-back or winger, he previously played in the Football League for both Barnet and Rushden & Diamonds. He represented the England semi-professional side.

Career
Mustafa was with Norwich City as a schoolboy before joining Wimbledon. He failed to make their first team and was released into non-league football. He joined Kettering Town for the 1996–97 season, leaving to join Barnet at the end of the season. His league debut came on 16 August 1997 when he played as a second-half substitute for Sam Stockley in the 2–1 defeat at home to Exeter City.

He struggled to establish himself at Barnet and was released at the end of the season, joining Kingstonian. In 1999, he scored the winning goal in the FA Trophy final for Kingstonian against Forest Green Rovers. Mustafa joined Rushden & Diamonds in June 2000 and was a regular in the Conference winning side the following season. He remained a regular in the Football League side the following season, but was transfer-listed in November 2002 after losing his place. He had a trial with Coventry City before joining Doncaster Rovers on loan in December 2002. He returned to Rushden after his month on loan, despite Doncaster offering a contract until the end of the 2004–05 season, and in February 2003 joined Dagenham & Redbridge, with his most notable goal coming against his former club Doncaster in a 3–2 defeat in the inaugural Conference Play-off Final.

In May 2004, Mustafa followed Dagenham manager Garry Hill to ambitious Conference South side Hornchurch and was part of the side that looked set to run away with the league the following season. However, in November 2004 Hornchurch were in serious financial trouble after the collapse of their main sponsor and placed their entire squad on the transfer list. Mustafa left and trained with Peterborough United before joining Aldershot Town in January 2005.

He was loaned to Billericay Town in October 2005, and was released by Aldershot in February 2006. He then moved to Lewes before soon joining Worthing, moving to Thurrock in September 2006 and Eastleigh in November 2006.

He was released by Eastleigh in July 2007 and the following month rejoined Worthing.

He has also played for Clapton, Leyton and Redbridge. For Redbridge he was a consistent performer playing an important role in their run to the Isthmian League Division One North Playoff Final against Canvey Island, which Canvey won after a tense shootout. Mustafa later joined Canvey ready for the 2008–09 season.

In the 2018–19 season, Mustafa made five league appearances for Benfleet whilst working at the club as a coach.

Personal life
Mustafa is of Turkish Cypriot origin.

Honours
Individual
Football Conference Team of the Year: 2002–03

References

External links

Profile at Flown from the Nest

1973 births
Living people
Footballers from Islington (district)
English footballers
England semi-pro international footballers
Association football fullbacks
Association football wingers
Wimbledon F.C. players
Kettering Town F.C. players
Barnet F.C. players
Kingstonian F.C. players
Rushden & Diamonds F.C. players
Doncaster Rovers F.C. players
Dagenham & Redbridge F.C. players
Hornchurch F.C. players
Aldershot Town F.C. players
Billericay Town F.C. players
Lewes F.C. players
Worthing F.C. players
Thurrock F.C. players
Eastleigh F.C. players
Redbridge F.C. players
Canvey Island F.C. players
Leyton F.C. players
Clapton F.C. players
Benfleet F.C. players
English Football League players
National League (English football) players
Isthmian League players
Sportspeople of Turkish Cypriot descent
English people of Turkish Cypriot descent
Association football coaches